The Daily Aaj is an Urdu language newspaper simultaneously being published from Peshawar, Islamabad and Abbottabad in Pakistan since 1989. Daily Aaj newspaper is a member of the All Pakistan Newspapers Society organization.

See also 
 List of newspapers in Pakistan

References

External links
  

Daily newspapers published in Pakistan
Urdu-language newspapers published in Pakistan
1989 establishments in Pakistan